Techo International Airport was the first airport in Bogotá, Colombia, which was in operation from 1930 to 1959, when it was replaced by El Dorado International Airport. It was adjacent to the current Monumento a las Banderas, on Avenida de Las Américas.

History
The history of Colombian aviation dates back to 1911, when there was an airplane show in Bogota. As a result, the capital decided to build an aerodrome.  Commerce began to strengthen, economic connections did not wait due to the rage it had taken, and the city was in the boom of aviation, thanks to its strategic point of union with municipalities and cities. 

The development of production in Colombia was crying out for a port that would allow direct access to the country's coastal areas. In 1920, the golden year for aviation in Bogotá, the Colombian Air Navigation Society and the German Colombian Society were founded.  Both provided air transport services. This year, in addition, he laid the first stone to trace the planning of the Techo aerodrome route.

The then manager of the Colombian American Society Herman Kuehl was the key man for the negotiation and construction of the aerodrome in the Techo premises. After a meticulous work on the space, by 1928, this space already had a landing strip for light aircraft, which was then a good news for a time when the economy was growing exponentially.

On August 7, the day of the Battle of Boyacá, 1930, the Techo aerodrome was completely inaugurated in the Government of Enrique Olaya Herrera, and the premises of Luis Carlos Paez. The airport was then ready for normal flights.

The airport, that was located where the current monument to the Flags is, was strategically equipped: the width of the runway is estimated to be 40 meters, control and communication towers, buildings, broadcast towers, a passenger platform and there, in the middle of the plain, the first urban colonization germinated, a bright and encouraging outlook for the capital.

Many citizens of the capital were unaware of these large flying machines, others had only seen them through the pages of a newspaper, but, for the first time, Bogotá had its own airport. However, it is too close to the city and hence, expansion is difficult due to high proximity of buildings.

The airport that operated for 30 years witnessed the country's first great economic explosion, until the founding of El Dorado Airport in 1959, which as a result, Techo Airport was closed down and demolished.

Historical airlines and destinations

References

External links
New York and Los Angeles
Techo: el histórico barrio de Bogotá que tuvo un aeropuerto
Braniff International route map, 1979

Defunct airports
Buildings and structures in Bogotá
1930 establishments in Colombia
1950s disestablishments in Colombia
Muysccubun